Sohu (also Romanized as Sohū; also known as Sahe, Sehu, and Sohūk) is a village in Tasuj Rural District, Shonbeh and Tasuj District, Dashti County, Bushehr Province, Iran. At the 2006 census, its population was 42, in 15 families.

References 

Populated places in Dashti County